Asar was a political party in Kazakhstan. 
In the 2004 Kazakh legislative election, the party won 11.4% of the popular vote and 4 out of 77 seats in the Mazhilis. Following calls from its leader Dariga Nazarbayeva for a united ruling party, and allegations that her father was becoming increasingly concerned by the group's independence, Asar merged with Otan.

The party's name comes from the Kazakh term meaning "Will Surpass." It is also the traditional word for helping people out.

Election Results

Mazhilis 

Defunct political parties in Kazakhstan
Political parties established in 2003
Political parties disestablished in 2006
2003 establishments in Kazakhstan